HMM or hmm may refer to:

Arts and entertainment
 Hail Mary Mallon, an American hip-hop group
 Hallmark Movies & Mysteries, a U.S. cable channel
 Heavy metal music, a subgenre of rock music
 Heroes of Might and Magic, a video game series (also abbreviated as HoMM)
 High-end Master Model, a high-quality Zoids model kit

Organizations
 Hatch Mott MacDonald, a North American engineering consulting firm
HMM, a South Korean shipping company
 Homenmen, an Armenian sporting organization

Science and technology
 Heavy meromyosin, a protein fragment
 Heterogeneous memory management, in the Linux kernel
 Hidden Markov model, a statistical model

Other uses
 Central Mashan Miao language (ISO 639-3 code), spoken in China
 Hammerton railway station (National Rail code), England, National Rail

See also
 Hum (sound), a wordless vocalization
 Interjection, Filler (linguistics)
 Homenmen (disambiguation)